Psilocybe mescaleroensis is a psychedelic mushroom which has psilocybin and psilocin as main active compounds.   This mushroom is closely related to Psilocybe hopii and Psilocybe cyanescens.  It was brought to scientific attention by Lee Walstad.

Description

Cap: 2 – 6 cm, convex to subumbonate, brownish-yellow, hygrophanous, margin striate when moist, often with an orangish center, broad umbo and wavy margin.  Has a separable gelatinous pellicle.   Bruising bluish where damaged.
Gills: Cream color when young, chocolate brown in age, with adnate to adnexed attachment.
Spores: Dark chocolate brown, subrhomboid to subovoid, thick-walled, 9 - 12 x 6 - 8 µm.  
Stipe: 5 – 10 cm long, .5 to 2 cm thick, white, sometimes with light orange patches, fibrillose, equal to slightly enlarged near the top.  Annulus fragile and membranous, white or dusted with dark brown spores.  Stem base with rhizomorphic mycelium. Bluing where damaged.
Taste: Slightly farinaceous.
Odor: Slightly farinaceous.
Microscopic features: Pleurocystidia absent.  Cheilocystidia 20 - 30 x 6 µm, fusiform or ventricose-rostrate, sometimes forked.

Distribution and habitat
Grows scattered to gregariously on dead grasses, in grasslands and savanna near ponderosa pine woodlands, often near gopher holes.  Found in the summer and fall in Lincoln County, NM. So far it has only been collected in or near the type locality.

References
 Guzmán, Gastón, Lee Walstad, Etelvina Gándara & Florencia Ramírez-Guillén. (2007). A new bluing species of Psilocybe, section Stuntzii from New Mexico, U.S.A. Mycotaxon 99: 223–226.

Fungi described in 2007
Fungi of North America
Entheogens
Psychoactive fungi
mescaleroensis
Psychedelic tryptamine carriers
Taxa named by Gastón Guzmán